Robert Gibbes (January 9, 1644 – June 24, 1715) was an English Landgrave, chairman and acting governor of the province of South Carolina between 1710-1712. Although he was elected acting governor by the Executive Council between the three proprietary deputies of former governor, Edward Tynte, after his death, received one vote more than his opponent Thomas Broughton, getting it through bribery. This sparked a conflict between both the oppositions and their supporters which finished with the Lords Proprietors declaring the election of Gibbes illegal (although they allowed them to rule for almost a year) and the appointment of Charles Craven as governor of South Carolina in 1711, who didn't arrive until 1712.

Biography

Early life 
Robert Gibbes was born in Sandwich, Kent County, England on January 9, 1644  to Robert Gibbes and Mary Coventry, both of whom were English. Later in life, Gibbes moved to Barbados, settling in Sandarich. Sometime before 1670, he and his brother, Thomas, attempted to find a settlement in Cape Fear, North Carolina for the Lords Proprietors, but their efforts failed. Gibbes then began to accumulate land in the South Carolina province. Gibbes was among the first settlers of Charles Town, South Carolina, in 1670.

Robert Gibbes began his political career in 1684 when he became a Sheriff of Carolina. He was an elected member of the First Commons House of Assembly in 1692, representing the Colleton County. In 1698, he was appointed a Proprietor's Deputy and a member of the Grand Council, as well as Chief Justice later the same year.

Government in South Carolina 
After the death of governor Edward Tynte in June 1710, Robert Gibbes was elected acting governor by the Executive Council, between the three proprietary deputies of Tynte. Gibbes won the position of governor after receiving only one vote more than his opponent, Thomas Broughton, which was achieved through bribery.

Both Broughton and Gibbes claimed their personal rights to rule the Council, with a majority of the people supporting Gibbes. 
In one incident, Broughton took gunmen and a group of slaves from his plantation and went to Charles Town in order to assert his right to access the government council. After running a short parliament, the party of Broughton demanded admission. Gibbes was interested in why Broughton came with a number of gunmen if he recognized himself as governor.
Broughton responded that they had come to the city because they were aware of the concerns in the province that indicated the likelihood of a negative event and the fact that the inhabitants did not favor Gibbes to rule the province.
Gibbes was subsequently refused entry to the city to Broughton. As a consequence, many of the men of Broughton galloped around the walls of the city. These included many sailors that favored Broughton, who gathered on ships in the local port with the intention of destroying the drawbridge. Gibbes's and his followers opposed them, but were forbidden from shooting them.

As a consequence, there was an armed confrontation between the two candidates for the city government and the men who supported them in militias. There were wounded men on both sides. They lowered the drawbridge, entered, and exercised the guard house on Broad Street. Some of the sailors of Broughton were captured.
Some militia fired their weapons, despite their leaders not having given firing orders. Despite this, no one was injured.

Broughton proceeded with his march for a short while longer. Broughton then proclaimed as governor, followed by a series of cheers. They approached the door of the city fortress and forced their entry.
 
Many knights were then presented to the door and tried to prevent them from entreating, resulting in a retreat to the bay. 
After much altercation and several discussions between both parties, the Lords Proprietors decided not to support any of them, nor Gibbes or Broughton, although the former acted as governor in meantime.
  
Charles Craven was soon appointed to take the place of Robert Gibbes in 1711.

Lords Proprietors declared that the election of Gibbes was illegal because it was established through bribery. However, they allowed Gibbes to rule for almost a year.
 
During the government of Robert Gibbes in South Carolina, the Tuscarora War began in North Carolina. Gibbes sent Colonels James Moore and John Barnwell to help in the Albemarle region.

Many of the local Native Americans abandoned the area shortly after the war began, taking all Tuscarora captive, except for one girl who was sold into slavery in the province of South Carolina. As a result, Colonel John Barnwell received rapid success throughout the wartime period.

Barnwell wrote to the acting governor Robert Gibbes in Charles Town that they had won the war and now had many provisions at their disposal, including fruit trees.

Gibbes ruled South Carolina until March 19, 1712. He was replaced upon the arrival to the province of the new governor (elected in 1711), Charles Craven.

Gibbes died on June 24, 1715, in South Carolina.

Personal life 
Gibbes married three times, the first two in Barbados. His first marriage was with Jane Davis (on October 24, 1678), with whom he had two children, namely Mary and Robert Gibbes. The second was with Mary Davis (on January 12, 1688), with whom he had three children: William, Elizabeth and John Gibbes. His third and final marriage was with Elizabeth Rixam (in 1710, in South Carolina).

References

External links 
 A South Carolina Genealogy:Information about Robert Gibbes
 Full text of "Robert Gibbes, Governor of South Carolina, and Some of His Descendants"

Colonial governors of South Carolina
1644 births
1715 deaths
English emigrants